Boreofairchildia nearctica (synonym Nemopalpus nearcticus, with the genus sometimes spelled Nemapalpus), the sugarfoot moth-fly, is a species of nematoceran flies in the family Psychodidae. It is endemic to the United States.

The IUCN conservation status of Nemopalpus nearcticus is "EN", endangered. The species faces a high risk of extinction in the near future.

References

External links

Endemic fauna of the United States
Insects of the United States
Psychodidae
Articles created by Qbugbot
Insects described in 1974